Trends in Analytical Chemistry is a peer reviewed journal in analytical chemistry with reviews of the latest developments in the field. Its editor as of 2019 is Janusz Pawliszyn.

The 2020 impact factor was 9.801.

Chemistry journals
Monthly journals
Elsevier academic journals